Sir Edward Bagnall Poulton, FRS HFRSE FLS (27 January 1856 – 20 November 1943) was a British evolutionary biologist, a lifelong advocate of natural selection through a period in which many scientists such as Reginald Punnett doubted its importance. He invented the term sympatric for evolution of species in the same place, and in his book The Colours of Animals (1890) was the first to recognise frequency-dependent selection. Poulton is also remembered for his pioneering work on animal coloration. He is credited with inventing the term aposematism for warning coloration, as well as for his experiments on 'protective coloration' (camouflage). Poulton became Hope Professor of Zoology at the University of Oxford in 1893.

Life 

Edward Poulton was born in Reading, Berkshire on 27 January 1856 the son of the architect William Ford Poulton and his wife, Georgina Sabrina Bagnall. He was educated at Oakley House School in Reading.

Between 1873 and 1876, Poulton studied at Jesus College, Oxford under George Rolleston and the anti-Darwinian entomologist John Obadiah Westwood, graduating with a first-class degree in natural science. He maintained an unbroken connection with the college for seventy years as scholar, lecturer and Fellow (appointed to a fellowship in 1898) until his death. He was a generous benefactor to Jesus College, providing silver for the high table and redecorating the Old Bursary amongst other donations.  

He was knighted by King George V in 1935. Poulton died in Oxford on 20 November 1943.

Career 

Poulton was throughout his career a Darwinist, believing in natural selection as the primary force in evolution. He not only admired Charles Darwin, but also defended the father of neo-Darwinism, August Weismann. Poulton was one of the group of biologists who first translated Weismann's work into English, and he defended Weismann's idea of the continuity of the germ-plasm. In the course of these translations, he noted that recent researches had reduced or perhaps entirely removed the role of acquired characters (Lamarckism) in species formation.

His 1890 book, The Colours of Animals, introduced the concepts of frequency-dependent selection and aposematic coloration, as well as supporting Darwin's then unpopular theories of natural selection and sexual selection.

Poulton enlarged the Hope entomological collections with his catches in the field which earned him the nickname of "Bag-all" Poulton. Many of the specimens are unmounted and held in biscuit tins (possibly acquired through Huntley & Palmer biscuits owned by his wife's family).

In his 1896 book Charles Darwin and the Theory of Natural Selection, Poulton described the Origin of Species as "incomparably the greatest work" the biological sciences had seen. Critics of natural selection, Poulton contended, had not taken the time to understand it. This is an evaluation which is much more widely held today than it was then, during the so-called eclipse of Darwinism. The contemporary ignorance of the mechanism of inheritance stood in the way of a full understanding of the mechanism of evolution.

In 1897 Poulton canvassed members during meetings of the Entomological Society of London. He discovered that many doubted a selectionist origin for mimicry. Of those he asked, only three fully supported Batesian mimicry and Müllerian mimicry. The others doubted the inedibility/unpalatability of the models (some investigators even performed taste tests!) or were not convinced that birds were effective selective agents. External and internal forces remained popular alternatives to natural selection.

The arrival of genetics 

The rediscovery of Mendel's work filled a critical gap in evolution theory, but at first this was not realised, and many thought it antithetical to selection. There was a long debate between Poulton and Reginald Punnett, one of Bateson's disciples and the first Professor of Genetics at Oxford. Punnett's Mimicry in butterflies (1915) rejected selection as the main cause of mimicry. He noted:

 The absence of transitional forms and the frequent lack of mimicry in male butterflies were unexplained by selectionist theory.
 The enigma of polymorphic mimicry. Some species of butterfly mimicked not merely one, but several models. In breeding experiments these polymorphs cleanly segregated according to Mendel's law of segregation.
 Evidence of birds as selective agents was slight and little was known of birds' discriminatory powers, and
 The gradual accumulation of minute variations did not (in his view) fit with the facts of heredity.

For Punnett, none of these observations were explained by gradual selectionism. Instead he thought mimicry had arisen from sudden mutational jumps (saltations). Once a mimic was formed by mutation, natural selection might play a conservative role.

However, one by one, each of these objections was shown to be without substance. Evidence from field observations and experiments showed that birds were often the agents of selection in insects. Evidence that small-scale mutations were common arrived as soon as breeding experiments were designed to detect them: it was a consequence of experimental methods that early mutations were so noteworthy. Explanations for polymorphism were advanced by E.B. Ford, Theodosius Dobzhansky and their colleagues, who developed experimental methods for populations in the wild.

The gradual coming-together of field observations and experimental genetics is part of the modern synthesis which took place in the middle of the twentieth century. As has become widely accepted, mutations increase the amount of heritable variation in a population, and selection is how biologists describe the differential viability of those variants. Poulton's account is much closer to a modern view of evolution, though Punnett had framed important questions.

Poulton's Presidential Address to the British Association in 1937 at the age of 81 reviewed the history of evolutionary thought. He stated that the work of J.B.S. Haldane, R.A. Fisher and Julian Huxley was vitally important for showing the relationships between Mendelism and natural selection. The observations and experiments of many biologists had "immensely strengthened and confirmed" the researches on mimicry and warning colours of pioneers like Bates, Wallace, Meldola, Trimen and Müller.

Family 

Poulton lived with his family at 56 Banbury Road in North Oxford, a large Victorian Gothic house designed by John Gibbs and built in 1866.

In 1881 he married Emily Palmer (d.1939), daughter of George Palmer, M.P. for Reading and head of Huntley and Palmer's biscuit company; they had five children. Three of them were dead by 1919. Their eldest son Dr. Edward Palmer Poulton of Guy's Hospital died in 1939, meaning that Sir Edward was outlived only by his daughter Margaret Lucy (1887–1965), wife of Dr Maxwell Garnett. Poulton's son, Ronald Poulton-Palmer played international rugby for England and was killed in May 1915 in World War I. His first daughter Hilda married Dr Ernest Ainsley-Walker and died in 1917.  His youngest daughter, Janet Palmer, married Charles Symonds in 1915 and died in 1919.

Legacy 
Poulton is remembered as an early originator of the biological species concept. According to Ernst Mayr, Poulton invented the term sympatric in relation to species, and he also invented the term aposematism for warning coloration.

Poulton, along with Julian Huxley, J.B.S. Haldane, R.A. Fisher and E.B. Ford, promoted the idea of natural selection through many years when it was denigrated.

Poulton was succeeded by G.D. Hale Carpenter as Hope Professor of Entomology at Oxford University from 1933 to 1948.

Published works

Poulton had over 200 publications spanning over sixty years.

 1890. The Colours of Animals: Their Meaning and Use, Especially Considered in the Case of Insects. Kegan Paul, London.
 1896. Charles Darwin and the Theory of Natural Selection. Cassell, London.
 1904. What is a Species? (Presidential address to the Entomological Society of London, Jan 1904) Proc. Ent. Soc. Lond. 1903.
 1908. Essays on Evolution. London, Cassell.
 1909. Charles Darwin and the Origin of species; addresses, etc., in America and England in the year of the two anniversaries
 1915. Science and the Great War: The Romanes Lecture for 1915 Clarendon Press, Oxford.

Awards and honours 
 Fellow of the Royal Society in June 1889.
 President of the Linnean Society (1912–1916)
 Royal Society's Darwin Medal in 1914
 Linnean Society's Linnean Medal in 1922.
 Knighted in 1935.
 President of the British Association for the Advancement of Science for 1937.

See also

Adaptive Coloration in Animals (book by Hugh Cott)

References

External links
 J. Mallet: Brief biography
 R. Yost: Biography
 Helen J. Power: Biography (paywall)
 
 Natural History Museum: Poulton (correspondence with Wallace, etc)

1856 births
1943 deaths
British evolutionary biologists
British zoologists
Critics of Lamarckism
Alumni of Jesus College, Oxford
Fellows of Jesus College, Oxford
English entomologists
Presidents of the Linnean Society of London
Fellows of the Royal Society
Presidents of the British Science Association
Hope Professors of Zoology
Presidents of the Oxford Union
Camouflage researchers